Xenosaurus tzacualtipantecus, the Zacualtipá́n knob-scaled lizard, is a lizard found in Mexico.

References

Xenosauridae
Reptiles described in 2012
Reptiles of Mexico

Lizards of North America